Hong glorious is a species of ladybird beetle in the genus Hong.

Taxonomy
The specific epithet is taken from the location and name of Mount Glorious.

See also
 Hong

References 

Coccinellidae
Species described in 2007